Lee Bo-ra (born 16 August 1986) is a South Korean female speed skater. She competed at the 2006 and 2010 Winter Olympics. She qualified for the Olympics in 2006, in which she placed 25th in 500 m and 34th in 1000 m. She again qualified for the Olympics in 2010, and placed 26th in the 500 m.

She also competed at the 2007 and 2011 Asian Winter Games.

Personal records

External links

Personal record

1986 births
South Korean female speed skaters
Speed skaters at the 2006 Winter Olympics
Speed skaters at the 2010 Winter Olympics
Speed skaters at the 2014 Winter Olympics
Olympic speed skaters of South Korea
Living people
Sportspeople from Gangwon Province, South Korea
Speed skaters at the 2007 Asian Winter Games
Speed skaters at the 2011 Asian Winter Games
21st-century South Korean women